Alejandro Cobo Higuera (1904 – 21 March 1950) was a Spanish-Mexican actor. He worked in the Golden Age of Mexican cinema, in films such as Virgen de medianoche (1942), The Eternal Secret (1942), The White Monk (1945), Hermoso ideal (1948), The Genius (1948) and The Magician (1949). He was the stepfather of Roberto Cobo.

Selected filmography
El rápido de las 9.15 (1941)
The Eternal Secret (1942)
I'm a Real Mexican (1942)
María Eugenia (1943)
El Misterioso señor Marquina (1943)
El corsario negro (1944)
The White Monk (1945)
The Genius (1948)
The Magician (1949)
The Bewitched House (1949)
The Devil Is a Woman (1950)
The King of the Neighborhood (1950)

References

Bibliography
Aviña, Rafael. David Silva: un campeón de mil rostros. UNAM, 2007. 
Ibarra, Jesús. Los Bracho: tres generaciones de cine mexicano. UNAM, 2006. 
García Riera, Emilio. Historia documental del cine mexicano, Volumen 18 1997. Universidad de Guadalajara, 1997.

External links

1904 births
1950 deaths
Mexican male film actors
Spanish male film actors
20th-century Mexican male actors
20th-century Spanish male actors
Spanish emigrants to Mexico